Philip J. Asherson (born 20 August 1960) is Professor of Molecular Psychiatry at the MRC Social, Genetic and Developmental Psychiatry Centre at the Institute of Psychiatry, Psychology and Neuroscience, King’s College London. He is known for his work on the genetics of ADHD in both adults and children.

References

External links
Faculty page

Living people
1960 births
Academics of King's College London
British psychiatrists
Attention deficit hyperactivity disorder researchers
Alumni of the University of Wales
Psychiatric geneticists
British geneticists